Kitsap may refer to:

Kitsap County, Washington
Kitsap Peninsula, a peninsula in western Washington state, lying between Hood Canal and Puget Sound.
Chief Kitsap, a Suquamish Indian for whom the county was named
Naval Base Kitsap, a US Navy base located in Kitsap County, Washington
Kitsap Beach, a town now known as Indianola, Washington
Kitsap BlueJackets, baseball team in Bremerton, Washington
Kitsap Transit